Georgios Syros (born 8 February 1976) is a Greek retired footballer who last played for Ethnikos Piraeus in his home country.

Career

Syros started his senior career with Akratitos. In 2001, he signed for Bury in the English Football League Second Division, making his debut against Wigan Athletic.  made ten appearances, including in a 5–1 loss to Brentford and scored one goal. After that, he played for Greek clubs AO Kerkyra, Thrasyvoulos, Kallithea, and Ethnikos Piraeus before retiring.

References

External links 
 

1976 births
Living people
Greek expatriate footballers
Expatriate footballers in England
Greek expatriate sportspeople in England
Association football defenders
A.P.O. Akratitos Ano Liosia players
Bury F.C. players
AO Chania F.C. players
A.O. Kerkyra players
Thrasyvoulos F.C. players
Kallithea F.C. players
Ethnikos Piraeus F.C. players
Super League Greece players
Footballers from Athens
Greek footballers